The electoral district of Greenvale is an electoral district of the Victorian Legislative Assembly in Australia. It was created in the redistribution of electoral boundaries in 2021, and came into effect at the 2022 Victorian state election.

It covers an area in the north western suburbs of Melbourne that was previously covered by the districts of Yuroke and Broadmeadows. It includes the suburbs of Roxburgh Park, Somerton, Greenvale, Meadow Heights, Attwood, and parts of Westmeadows and Craigieburn.

Members for Greenvale

Election results

See also

Parliaments of the Australian states and territories
List of members of the Victorian Legislative Assembly

References

Greenvale, Electoral district of
2022 establishments in Australia
City of Hume
Electoral districts and divisions of Greater Melbourne